Pasmo Brzanki Landscape Park (Park Krajobrazowy Pasma Brzanki) is a protected area (Landscape Park) in southern Poland, established in 1995.

The Park is shared between two voivodeships: Lesser Poland Voivodeship and Subcarpathian Voivodeship. Within Lesser Poland Voivodeship it lies in Tarnów County (Gmina Gromnik, Gmina Ryglice, Gmina Rzepiennik Strzyżewski, Gmina Tuchów, Gmina Szerzyny). Within Subcarpathian Voivodeship it lies in Dębica County (Gmina Jodłowa) and Jasło County (Gmina Brzyska, Gmina Skołyszyn).

Within the Landscape Park are four nature reserves.

References 

Pasmo Brzanki
Parks in Lesser Poland Voivodeship